The 2nd Senate District of Wisconsin is one of 33 districts in the Wisconsin State Senate.  Located in northeast Wisconsin, the district comprises most of Shawano and Outagamie counties, as well as parts of eastern Waupaca County and western Brown County.  It includes the villages of Allouez and Ashwaubenon, in the Green Bay metro area, and the city of Kaukauna, near Appleton.

Current elected officials
Robert Cowles is the senator representing the 2nd district. He was first elected in a 1987 special election, and is now serving his 9th term.  Before his election as senator, he was a member of the Wisconsin State Assembly from 1983 to 1987.

Each Wisconsin State Senate district is composed of three Wisconsin State Assembly districts.  The 2nd Senate district comprises the 4th, 5th, and 6th Assembly districts.  The current representatives of those districts are: 
 Assembly District 4: David Steffen (R–Howard)
 Assembly District 5: Joy Goeben (R–Hobart)
 Assembly District 6: Peter Schmidt (R–Bonduel)

The district is located within Wisconsin's 8th congressional district, which is represented by U.S. Representative Mike Gallagher.

Past senators

Note: the boundaries of districts have changed over history. Previous politicians of a specific numbered district have represented a completely different geographic area, due to redistricting.

The district has previously been represented by:

See also
Political subdivisions of Wisconsin

References

External links
2nd Senate District, Senator Cowles in the Wisconsin Blue Book (2005–2006)

Wisconsin State Senate districts
Shawano County, Wisconsin
Outagamie County, Wisconsin
Brown County, Wisconsin
1848 establishments in Wisconsin